The Argentina men's national under-21 field hockey team represents Argentina in men's international under-21 field hockey competitions and is controlled by the Argentine Hockey Confederation, the governing body for field hockey in Argentina.

The team competes in the Pan American Junior Championship which they have won a record eleven times. They have qualified for all Junior World Cups which they have won twice.

Tournament record

Junior World Cup

Junior Pan American Championship

Current squad
The following 18 players were named on 29 October 2021 for the 2021 Men's FIH Hockey Junior World Cup in Bhubaneswar, India.

Caps updated as of 5 December 2021, after the match against Germany.

Youth team

Tournament records

Youth squad
The following players were listed on the roster for the 2022 events:

Head Coach: Juan Gilardi.

References

External links

Under-21
Men's national under-21 field hockey teams